Robert Emmett Joyce (January 14, 1915 – December 10, 1981) was an American professional baseball player, a right-handed pitcher who worked in 44 games in the Major Leagues for the Philadelphia Athletics (1939) and New York Giants (1946).

Born in Stockton, California, Joyce's professional career began in 1934. His professional career extended through 1949, with the exception of the 1937 baseball season. He won 172 games in minor league baseball, and was a stalwart member of the pitching staff of the San Francisco Seals of the Pacific Coast League during World War II, winning 22, 20 and 21 games from 1942 to 1944, and 31 games (against only 11 defeats) with a 2.17 earned run average in 1945. He was named the PCL's Most Valuable Player for 1945.

Joyce's Major League career consisted of 30 games for the 1939 Athletics and 14 for the 1946 Giants. He started 13 games and registered three complete games. All together he surrendered 235 hits and 57 bases on balls, with 49 strikeouts, in 168 Major League innings pitched.

References

External links

1915 births
1981 deaths
Akron Yankees players
Baseball players from California
Binghamton Triplets players
Los Angeles Angels (minor league) players
Major League Baseball pitchers
Memphis Chickasaws players
Minneapolis Millers (baseball) players
New York Giants (NL) players
Norfolk Tars players
Oakland Oaks (baseball) players
Philadelphia Athletics players
Portland Beavers players
San Francisco Seals (baseball) players
Wheeling Stogies players
Pacific Coast League MVP award winners